, is a musical Greek mythology-based Japanese anime series, based on the 1977 manga series  Olympus no Pollon ("Pollon of Olympus") by Hideo Azuma. The anime television series consisted of 46 episodes and aired across Japan on Fuji TV and across Italy on Italia 1 from May 1982 to March 1983. The series is noted for its faithful portrayal of the Gods of Mount Olympus as fallible beings succumbing to real human faults and weaknesses, such as selfishness, temper tantrums, debauchery, laziness, and vanity.

Story
The main character of the story is Pollon, a sweet, precocious little girl who is the daughter of the God of the Sun, Apollo. Pollon's goal in life is to grow up to become a beautiful and powerful goddess. She attempts to do good deeds and help out any way she can in order to achieve the status of godhood. Invariably, her overtures backfire and end up causing major trouble for both the gods of Olympus and their human subjects. However, Pollon's kind heart, perseverance and indomitable spirit win out in the end, as she attains the title of "Goddess of Hope".

Characters
 Pollon
 
 The daughter of Apollo, the sun-god, she is a kind-hearted but somewhat naive girl who wants to be a goddess when she grows up. However, her attempts to prove herself worthy of the title of goddess usually result in disasters of comic proportions.
 Eros
 
 The God of Love, and Pollon's cousin and best friend. He shoots heart-tipped arrows at people to make them fall in love, but as he is quite an ugly creature, he ironically has no girlfriend of his own.
 Apollo
 
 Pollon's father and also Eros' uncle, the God of the Sun. He is a lazy drunk who is somewhat neglectful of his daughter. His main job is to drive the Sun's chariot across the sky each day, but as he is often too lazy and/or drunk to do so, Pollon often ends up driving the chariot herself.
 Zeus
 
 The king of the gods, father of Apollo and grandfather of Pollon. Despite his advanced age, he has a strong attraction to younger women, which often gets him in trouble with his wife, Hera.
 Hera
 
 The queen of the gods, mother of Apollo and grandmother of Pollon. She is portrayed as the stereotypical hen-pecking wife, somewhat neurotic and given to temper tantrums, and often responds violently to her husband Zeus' flirtatious ways.
 Artemis
 
 The Goddess of the Moon, one of Pollon's aunts.
 Aphrodite
 
 The Goddess of Beauty, and another of Pollon's aunts. She is also the mother of Eros. Aphrodite is very beautiful and very vain, and spends hours admiring herself in the mirror. She's ashamed of her unattractive son and frequently disowns him.
 Poseidon
 
 The God of the Sea is very tall in stature, towering way over the other gods. Although he is the god of the sea, he ironically can't swim.
 Atlas
 
 Atlas is the Titan who holds the weight of the sky. It is shown that he is ticklish.
 Hephaestus
 
 God of smiting and Aphrodite's husband, he's an amiable, if bumbling, inventor. He however dislikes most of the other male gods, especially Apollo, because they're more handsome than him.
 Athena
 
 The armor-clad goddess of wisdom and war. One of the most serious and wise characters in the cast. Nonetheless, others dislike her prickly attitude.
 Dionysus
 
 God of wine and merrymaking, he's a bald, stout man with dark glasses. He's never seen without a bottle in his hand. The other gods very much enjoy his company (and the wine he brews).
 Hades
 
 God of the underworld, he reigns unopposed over his realm with his wife Persephone. They enjoy inflicting the most absurd punishments and tortures on the damned.
 Dr. Nahaha
 
 A somewhat modern-looking scientist. Bumbling and foolish, he genuinely believes himself the "sanest person in this crazy world of fools". He tries to help Pollon by providing her with concoctions and potions that, according to him, could potentially solve every trouble Pollon meets in her adventures, but they always fail to provide the intended effect. He also provides Pollon with a powder able to induce happiness and euphoria.
 Dosankos
 
 Apollo's horse.
 The Sun
 
 The long-suffering Sun is often ripped, torn or otherwise disturbed by Pollon and/or the other gods. He has become a heavy smoker to deal with the stress in his life.
 Azuma Bug
 
 A cute little insect author surrogate who tells the story of Pollon and the gods as it unfolds.
 The Goddess of Goddesses
 
 An anime-exclusive character that serves as a mentor to Pollon.

Overseas distribution
In addition to its success in Japan and Italy, Little Pollon has been a very successful television program in France on La Cinq in the late 1980s under the title , with Pollon's name changed to "Olympe". In Spain, the series was broadcast with the name  Polon; in the region of Catalonia, it was known as  Polon, and it was also distributed on VHS in Spanish. Only 24 episodes of the 46 were dubbed in Spanish and Catalan.
Enoki Films USA holds the U.S. license to the anime series, although no English-language dub or subtitling of the series has ever been commercially released.

The Little Pollon production team followed up the series in 1983 with another anime based on a Hideo Azuma manga, Nanako SOS. In one scene in Nanako SOS, the Little Pollon anime is being played on television.

Anime staff (original print)
 Original creator: Hideo Azuma
 Executive producer: Juzo Tsubota
 Series director: Takao Yotsuji
 Scenarists: Masaru Yamamoto, Kenji Terada, Toyohiro Ando
 Character designs: Toshio Takagi, Tsutomu Fujita
 Animation directors: Toshio Takagi, Hirokazu Ishiyuki
 Music: Masayuki Yamamoto
 Theme song performance: Yoshie Hara
 Production: Kokusai Eiga (Movie International Co., Ltd.) / Fuji TV

Anime staff (italian version)
 Italian production: Mediaset
 Original creator: Hideo Azuma
 Executive producer: Juzo Tsubota
 Series director: Takao Yotsuji
 Scenarists: Masaru Yamamoto, Kenji Terada, Toyohiro Ando
 Character designs: Toshio Takagi, Tsutomu Fujita
 Animation directors: Toshio Takagi, Hirokazu Ishiyuki
 Music: Masayuki Yamamoto
 Theme song performance: Yoshie Hara
 Production: Kokusai Eiga (Movie International Co., Ltd.) / Fuji TV

References

External links
 
 

1977 manga
1982 anime television series debuts
Akita Shoten manga
Comedy anime and manga
Fantasy anime and manga
Fuji TV original programming
Classical mythology in anime and manga
Greek and Roman deities in fiction
Hideo Azuma
Shōjo manga
Television series based on classical mythology
Television series set in ancient Greece